The Armagh Senior Football Championship is an annual Gaelic football competition contested by top-tier Armagh GAA clubs. The Armagh County Board of the Gaelic Athletic Association has organised it since 1889.

Clann Éireann are the title holders (2021) defeating Crossmaglen Rangers in the Final.

History

The first official football champions of Armagh, following the creation in 1889 of the County Board, were Armagh Harps, in the 1889 final which saw the defeat of Blackwatertown in Armagh by a scoreline of 4-14 to 0-03. Crossmaglen Rangers have won the Armagh senior football championship on most occasions, with 40 victories since 1906, including a run of 13 wins from 1996 to 2008. During the 1997-2000 victorious seasons, Crossmaglen went on to claim three All-Ireland Club Championships in four years. They have since added All-Ireland titles in 2007, 2011 and 2012.

Honours
The trophy presented to the winners is the Gerry Fagan Cup. The winners of the Armagh Championship qualify to represent their county in the Ulster Senior Club Football Championship. The winners can, in turn, go on to play in the All-Ireland Senior Club Football Championship.

List of finals
(r) = replay

More information: 

Armagh Senior Leagues

Wins listed by club

References

External links
 Official Armagh GAA Website
 Armagh GAA Supporters Website
 Armagh at ClubGAA

 
Senior Gaelic football county championships
Gaelic football competitions in County Armagh